The Thangal Kunju Musaliar College of Engineering, commonly known as TKMCE, is the first government-aided engineering institution in the Indian state of Kerala inaugurated on 3 July 1958. It is the first Government aided engineering college in Kerala. The institution is affiliated to KTU. The college is affiliated to APJ Abdul Kalam Technological University since its inception in 2015.

History 

The college was founded by the TKM Educational Trust, an organization established by Thangal Kunju Musaliar. The college's foundation stone was laid on 3 February 1956 by Rajendra Prasad, the first President of India, and was inaugurated by Humayun Kabir, the Cabinet Minister for Scientific and Cultural Affairs, on 3 July 1958. The institution then went on to become the first government-aided institution in the state of Kerala.

Campus 

The college is located at Karicode, a suburb town of the coastal city of Kollam on the Kollam- Sengottai NH-208 road. The college is 6 kilometres away from Kollam city centre (Chinnakada), and 2.2 kilometres from Kallumthazham junction.

Organisation and administration

Governance
The administration of the college is vested in a Governing Body consisting of representatives of the T.K.M College Trust, Govt: Of Kerala, and All India Council for Technical Education. The Governing Body is headed by S.H.Musaliar as Chairman and the Principal as the Ex-officio secretary.

Departments 
 Dept. of Computer Science and Engineering
 Dept. of Electrical and Computer Engineering
 Dept. of Electronics and Communication Engineering
 Dept. of Electrical and Electronics Engineering
 Dept. of Mechanical Engineering
 Dept. of Civil Engineering
 Dept. of Chemical Engineering
 Dept. of Mechanical-Production Engineering
 Dept. of Architecture
 Dept. of MCA
 Dept. of Mathematics
 Dept. of Physics
 Dept. of Chemistry
 Dept. of Economics
 Dept. of Physical Education
 Center for Artificial Intelligence

Facilities 
The college has a central library with over 70,350 books, around 100 technical journals, and periodicals.

Academics
The institute offers BTech programs in eight branches of engineering, five MTech programs and a Computer Applications (MCA) Program.

Accreditation and affiliation
TKMCE was accredited by the National Assessment and Accreditation Council with a validity up to November 2021. Ten programmes are approved by the All India Council for Technical Education (AICTE) for 2019–2020, some which are accredited by the National Board of Accreditation (NBA). The programmes are affiliated with APJ Abdul Kalam Technological University.

Admission 

 Post Graduation

Admission to MCA is based on the Kerala LBS Entrance Examination, conducted by the Office of LBS Exams run by the Government of Kerala.

Admission to MTech is based on Graduate Aptitude Test in Engineering (GATE).

Admission to MBA is based on Management Aptitude Test (MAT) conducted by the All India Management Association and Common Management Admission Test (CMAT) conducted by All India Council for Technical Education (AICTE).

 Under Graduation Admission to undergraduate courses is based on the Kerala Engineering Architecture Medical (KEAM), administered by the Government of Kerala, India. Some seats are reserved for students from Arunachal Pradesh, Andaman and Lakshadweep, and also in the management quota.

 PhD candidates are admitted as per APJ Abdul Kalam Technological University norms.

Sports 

 Football Ground
 Cricket Practice Nets
 Indoor Badminton Court
 Basketball court
 Tennis court
 Volleyball court
 Squash court (under construction)

Teams Sent For University Games

 Cricket Team
 Football Team
 Basketball Team
 Volleyball Team
 Handball Team
 Athletics Team
 Badminton Team
 Tennis Team
 Table Tennis Team
 Chess Team

Student life

TEDxTKMCE 
A TEDx event was organised by students of TKMCE, Kollam on 11 August 2018. The theme of the event was "Alchemy".

Alumni 

The alumni association was formed in 1963. It has chapters in various states of India and around the world.
Notable alumni include:

Justice Raja Vijayaraghavan V., Judge, Kerala High Court.
M. Jayachandran, film score composer, singer, and musician.
S. Somanath, Chairman of Indian Space Research Organization (ISRO)
 Shibu Baby John, former Labour Minister of the State Government of Kerala.
 T. K. Alex, former director of Indian Space Research Organisation Satellite Centre (ISAC).
 Suraj Mani, Indian rock musician.

See also
National Institute of Technology Calicut
College of Engineering Trivandrum
Mar Athanasius College of Engineering
 NSS College of Engineering
 Educational Institutions in Kollam District

References

External links 

 TKMCE website

Engineering colleges in Kollam
APJ Abdul Kalam Technological University